Sure may refer to:

 Seemingly unrelated regressions
 Series of Unsurprising Results in Economics (SURE), an economics academic journal
 Sure, as probability, see certainty
 Sure (brand), a brand of antiperspirant deodorant 
 Sure (company), a telecommunications company operating in British Crown Dependencies and Overseas Territories
 Stein's unbiased risk estimate (SURE), in estimation theory
 The river Sauer

In music
 "Sure" (Every Little Thing song), from the album Eternity
 "Sure" (Take That song), from the album Nobody Else

See also
 Shure